Cutting is the division or separation of a physical object with an edged instrument.

Cutting or cuttings may also refer to:

Entertainment
 Film editing
 Cut (music), a musical and deejaying technique
 The act of competing in or winning a cutting contest, a type of musical battle

Human behaviour
 Cutting in line, the act of entering a queue at any position other than the end
 A form of self-harm

Sport and leisure
 Cutting (sport), an equestrian event
 Cutting (cards), a common practice in card games to prevent cheating
 Weight cutting, the practice of rapid weight loss prior to a sporting competition
 Cutting in, the act of taking a dance partner from another
 A bodybuilding strategy

Transport
 Cutting (automobile)
 Cutting (transportation), an excavation to make way for a transport route
 A form of naval boarding, popular during the age of sail

Other uses
 Cutting (surname), a surname
 Cutting, Moselle, France
 Cutting (plant), a technique for plant propagation
 Cutting horse, horse trained to cut cattle
 The act of using a cutting agent to dilute drugs

See also
 Cut (disambiguation)
 Cutter (disambiguation)
 Tribology